Naane Raja is a 1956 Indian Tamil-language film, directed by R. R. Chandiran. The film stars Sivaji Ganesan and Sriranjani. It was released on 25 January 1956.

Plot

Cast 

Male cast
 Sivaji Ganesan as Villalan
 T. S. Balaiah
 S. V. Subbaiah
 S. V. Sahasranamam
 M. K. Mustafa
 V. Gopalakrishnan as Thanajayan
 N. S. Subbaiah
 Chandrababu (Guest Artist)
 E. R. Sahadevan (Guest Artist)

Female cast
 Sriranjani as Thenmozhi
 M. N. Rajam as Mangani
 Girija
 T. P. Muthulakshmi
 Angamuthu
 Mohana
Dance
 Kumari Kamala
 Ambika

Soundtrack 
The music was composed by T. R. Ramnath. Lyrics are by Bharathidasan, Thanjai Ramaiah Dass, Kavi K. P. Kamatchisundaram, Lakshmanadas and Kuyilan.

References

External links 
 

1950s Tamil-language films
1956 films